Fully Loaded is the debut studio album by Nigerian singer Duncan Mighty. It was released on 31 May 2009.

Background

The 22-track album has a running time of 78 minutes and it features Queen of Africa, Bomba Crack, Timaya, Sandazblack,  Kestabone, Nigga Raw and DJ Olu

The album was produced by award-winning producer and director D Supremo.

Singles

"Ako Na Uche" was a hit single from the album Fully Loaded.

Track listing

Reception
Toye Sokumbi of The Native wrote that "[t]he Portharcourt first son dominated his hometown's underground for years, reaching mainstream popularity with the release of his 2009 album Fully Loaded."

The album was a major hit in Nigeria, Ghana and other African countries as both young and old people were able to vibe to it.

See also

 Music of Port Harcourt

References 

Duncan Mighty albums
2009 debut albums